The notable universities, colleges, and coaching classes in Bikaner city in Rajasthan, India.

Universities 
 Maharaja Ganga Singh University
 UNAM (Universidad Autonoma de México)
 Rajasthan University of Veterinary and Animal Sciences
 Ram Narayan Bajaj Global University
 Swami Keshwanand Rajasthan Agricultural University
 Vardhman Mahavir Open University Kota, Bikaner

Colleges 

 B.J.S. Rampuria Jain Law College, Bikaner (RLC)
 Engineering College, Bikaner (ECB)
 College of Engineering & Technology, Bikaner
 Sardar Patel Medical College, Bikaner
 Veterinary College, Bikaner
 Marudhar Eng.college
 Keen College
 Dungar College
 Maharani Sudarshan College (M.S. College)
 B.J.S. Rampuria Jain College
 Shri Jain P.G. College
 Shri Nehru Sharda Peeth
 Binani Girls College
 Shri Jain Girls College
 Institute of Management Studies
 After School Centre for Social Entrepreneurship
 Government Polytechnic College Bikaner
 M.N Institute of Applied Sciences
 Manda Institute of Technology
 Basic PG College
 Sister Nivedita Girls College, Bikaner, Rajasthan, India

Coaching classes 

 C Institute, an institute which focuses on programming language and software courses 
 Acme Embedded Technologies Pvt. Ltd, an institute which focuses on programming language, software, and other IT courses

Exclusively for Pre-Medical 

 Synthesis
 Bansal Classes Kota Pvt. Ltd
 Ignite Institute
 Sigma Institute Bikaner
Clc coaching center
 Ravi Engineer

Exclusively for Pre-Engineering 

 Syn-JEE
 Connix
 Advance Career Institute

See also
List of schools in Bikaner, Rajasthan

B.J.S. Rampuria Jain Law College Bikaner

References

Universities and colleges
Bikaner
Bikaner